Auguste de Châtillon (29 January 1808 – 26 March 1881) was a French painter, sculptor and poet. He was born and died in Paris. He, Théophile Gautier, Gérard de Nerval and Arsène Houssaye formed the "bohème du Doyenné".

Life
He first exhibited at the Paris Salon of 1831, initially painting portraits of subjects such as Gautier, Victor Hugo and Hugo's family, including one of Hugo and his son François-Victor and another of Hugo's daughter Léopoldine. He designed costumes for Hugo's 1832 premiere Le Roi s’amuse and painted the woodwork in de Nerval's living room. He lived in New Orleans from 1844 to 1851 and on his return to France published a poetry collection in 1855 entitled Chant et poésie, which was twice republished and expanded under the title À la Grand'Pinte, poésies d'Auguste de Châtillon in 1860 and as Les Poésies d'Auguste Châtillon in 1866. In the preface to the 1855 edition, Gautier wrote of the writer-painter "he reconciles simplicity and artifice, and his poems can bawl at the cabaret and sign in the living-room. In a short letter to him on 8 April 1869, Hugo wrote "There is something in you of La Fontaine's easy grace combined with an extra melancholy charm". The collection includes works in both Romantic and earlier styles, portraits of the time and evocations of Montmartre and New Orleans. The two most noted poems at the time were À la Grand’Pinte and La Levrette en paletot.

Gallery

References

19th-century French poets
19th-century French painters
French portrait painters
19th-century French sculptors
Writers from Paris
1808 births
1881 deaths
Painters from Paris